Streptomyces hainanensis is a bacterium species from the genus of Streptomyces which has been isolated from soil in from the island Hainan in China.

See also 
 List of Streptomyces species

References

Further reading

External links
Type strain of Streptomyces hainanensis at BacDive -  the Bacterial Diversity Metadatabase

hainanensis
Bacteria described in 2007